The voiced retroflex lateral fricative is a type of consonantal sound. The IPA has no symbol for this sound, though there is an extIPA letter for it, added to Unicode in 2021.

Features
Features of the voiced retroflex lateral fricative:

Occurrence

See also
Index of phonetics articles

Notes

References

Lateral consonants
Fricative consonants
Pulmonic consonants
Voiced oral consonants
Retroflex consonants